Dacrydium beccarii is a species of conifer in the family Podocarpaceae. It is found in Indonesia, Malaysia, Papua New Guinea, the Philippines, and Solomon Islands.

References 

beccarii
Least concern plants
Taxonomy articles created by Polbot